Lambula fuliginosa is a moth of the family Erebidae. It was described by Francis Walker in 1862. It is found on Borneo. The habitat consists of montane forests, dipterocarp forests and lowland forests.

References

 

Lithosiina
Moths described in 1862